Stenaelurillus pilosus is  a species of jumping spider in the genus Stenaelurillus that is endemic to Nigeria. It was first described in 2011 by Wanda Wesołowska and Anthony Russell-Smith. It can be distinguished from other species in the genus by the dark brown band on its clypeus, the distinctive long orangish-brown hairs on its black eye field, the male's straight embolus and the presence of two fissure-like openings in the epigyne on the female.

Taxonomy
Stenaelurillus pilosus was first described by Wanda Wesołowska and Anthony Russell-Smith in 2011. It is one of over 500 species identified by the Polish arachnologist Wesołowska. The genus Stenaelurillus was first raised by Eugène Simon in 1885. The name relates to the genus name Aelurillus, which itself derives from the Greek word for cat, with the addition of a Greek stem meaning narrow. In 2017, it was grouped with nine other genera of jumping spiders under the name Aelurillines. It has been placed in the subtribe Aelurillina in the tribe Aelurillini in the clade Saltafresia. The species name relates to the long bristles on the outside of the carapace on the male of the species.

Description
The spider is medium sized. It has a brown pear-shaped carapace which is edged with dark iridescent bristles. It has two stripes of white scales that run down the thorax. The shape of the abdomen differs from other species of Stenaelurillus, which are typically oblong. The eye field is black, with distinctive long orangish brown hairs. The spinnerets are brown and the legs are yellow. The palpal bulb is similar to Stenaelurillus hirsutus, Stenaelurillus glaber and Stenaelurillus striolatus. However, the embolus is distinct as it is straight. The spider can also be distinguished from these species by the fact that the clypeus has a dark brown band.

The epigyne has two fissure-like openings. It has a narrow shallow pocket and copulatory openings that are widely separated slits. These features of the epigyne distinguish it from other spiders. Otherwise, the spider is very similar to Stenaelurillus iubatus, with one of the original examples of Stenaelurillus pilosus later being recognised as a paratype of the other species.

Distribution and habitat
The species is endemic to Nigeria. The holotype for the species was near Ibadan in 1973. The spider has been found in both fallow bush and on roadside verges.

References

Citations

Bibliography

Endemic fauna of Nigeria
Fauna of Nigeria
Salticidae
Spiders described in 2011
Spiders of Africa
Taxa named by Wanda Wesołowska